is a Japanese light novel series written by MINE and illustrated by Kabocha.  The series is licensed in English by J-Novel Club.  A manga adaptation by Satoru Abou was serialized from 2016 to 2021, and an anime television series adaptation by Seven Arcs Pictures was scheduled to premiere in October 2018, before it was cancelled on June 6, 2018.  Following the announcement of the anime adaptation, the series and its author began to face criticism for controversial material in the novels and in Twitter posts that MINE had made between 2012 and 2015.

Media

Light novels
MINE originally serialized the story as a web novel on the user-generated content site Shōsetsuka ni Narō starting on January 3, 2014.  Following the controversy that broke out after the announcement of the anime adaptation, MINE announced plans on June 5, 2018, to discontinue serialization of the web novel. Hobby Japan acquired the series for print publication, and published the first light novel, with illustrations by Kabocha, under their HJ Novels imprint in November 2014.  English publisher J-Novel Club announced their license to the series on January 13, 2018. On June 6, 2018, it was reported that Hobby Japan had cancelled shipments of the light novel series.  On June 15, 2018, J-Novel Club announced that they would cease publishing the series on July 1, 2018.

Manga
A manga adaptation by Satoru Abou is published on Kadokawa Shoten's ComicWalker website.  The manga went on hiatus in late May 2018 following the controversy surrounding the author. It returned from hiatus on August 22, 2018 and ended on December 3, 2021.

Cancelled Anime
An anime television series adaptation was announced on May 22, 2018, and was scheduled to premiere in October 2018.  The series would have been directed by Keitaro Motonaga and written by Takamitsu Kouno, Touko Machida, Koujirou Nakamura, and Chabo Higurashi, with animation by Seven Arcs Pictures.  Makoto Takahoko would have provided the series' character designs. However, on June 6, 2018, it was announced that the production and broadcast of the anime had been cancelled due to the controversy surrounding the author and his novels.

Controversy
Following the announcement of the anime adaptation, the series and its author became the subject of a controversy.  A number of commentators on Twitter claimed that the series depicts the protagonist as having taken part in the Second Sino-Japanese War, where he killed 3,000 people with a katana, later going on to kill another 2,000 after the war.  Additionally, commentators discovered several tweets by the author from 2013 to 2015 containing insulting statements about China, as well as tweets from 2012 to 2014 that allegedly contained similar messages about South Korea.

On June 5, 2018, author MINE apologized via Twitter. He also deleted all of his past Tweets and announced plans to leave Twitter once his apology spread.  In regards to the content of his novels, MINE stated that he would no longer serialize the web novel on Shōsetsuka ni Narō and would begin discussions with his publisher about correcting inappropriate material in the print versions.

On June 6, 2018, voice actors Toshiki Masuda, Megumi Nakajima, and Kiyono Yasuno simultaneously announced their resignations from the anime adaptation.  The actors were set to play the parts of Renya Kunugi, Rona Chevalier, and Shion Femme-Fatale, respectively. On the same day, talent management agency 81 Produce announced that Nanami Yamashita, originally set to play God in the series, was also resigning.

Also on June 6, the website for the anime became unavailable worldwide except Japan, returning only a 403 Forbidden error. The production committee then posted an announcement on the website that production and broadcast of the anime had been cancelled due to the controversy.  The committee also apologized.

Hobby Japan, the publisher of the original light novel series, posted an apology on June 6.  Later that day, the Asahi Shimbun reported that the publisher had decided to cancel shipments of the light novel.

On June 15, 2018, J-Novel Club announced that they would suspend publication of the series on July 1, 2018, and would no longer offer it for sale "pending further consultation with the Japanese rights holder".

References

External links
  at Shōsetsuka ni Narō
  
  (available only in Japan) 
  
 
 

2014 Japanese novels
Adventure anime and manga
Anime and manga based on light novels
Anime and manga controversies
Anti-Chinese sentiment in Asia
Anti-Japanese sentiment in China
Anti-Japanese sentiment in South Korea
Anti-Korean sentiment in Japan
China–Japan relations
Isekai anime and manga
Isekai novels and light novels
J-Novel Club books
Japan–South Korea relations
Kadokawa Shoten manga
Light novels first published online
Light novels
Race-related controversies in comics
Race-related controversies in literature
Seinen manga
Shōsetsuka ni Narō
Twitter controversies
Unaired television shows
Works banned in China